Lyon Township is a township in Dickinson County, Kansas, USA.  As of the 2000 census, its population was 252.

Geography
According to the USGS, it contains one cemetery, Saint Johns.

The stream of Kohls Creek runs through this township.

Further reading

References

 USGS Geographic Names Information System (GNIS)

External links
 City-Data.com

Townships in Dickinson County, Kansas
Townships in Kansas